Trixie is a 2000 American mystery-crime film directed by Alan Rudolph and starring Emily Watson, Nick Nolte, Will Patton and Brittany Murphy.

Plot 
Trixie Zurbo is an eccentric woman who longs to quit her job as a security guard in a department store and become a private detective. She finally gets her wish when she takes a job in security at a casino. She accidentally becomes involved in a murderous plot and Trixie takes her first case; however, her unschooled command of the English language and comedy intervenes and the mess begins.

Cast

Release

The film premiered on June 28, 2000 in New York City and Los Angeles, California.

Reception
On Rotten Tomatoes, the film holds an approval rating of 28%, based on 50 reviews, and an average rating of 4.1/10. The website's critical consensus states "Boring and predictable script; not funny." On Metacritic, the film has a weighted average score of 26 out of 100, based on 28 critics, indicating "generally unfavorable reviews".

References

External links

 

2000 films
2000s crime comedy-drama films
2000s comedy mystery films
American mystery comedy-drama films
American crime comedy-drama films
American detective films
Films directed by Alan Rudolph
Films scored by Mark Isham
Films scored by Roger Neill
2000s English-language films
2000s American films